Gaziantep Province is a province in south-central Turkey. It is located in the westernmost part of Turkey's Southeastern Anatolia Region and partially in the Mediterranean Region. Its capital is the city of Gaziantep. It neighbours Adıyaman to the northeast, Şanlıurfa to the east, Syria and Kilis to the south, Hatay to the southwest, Osmaniye to the west and Kahramanmaraş to the northwest.

An important trading center since ancient times, the province is also one of Turkey's major manufacturing zones, and its agriculture is dominated by the cultivation of pistachio nuts.

In ancient times, first under the power of Yamhad, then the Hittites and later the Assyrians controlled the region.  It saw much fighting during the Crusades, and Saladin won a key battle there in 1183. After World War I and the Ottoman Empire's disintegration, it was invaded by the forces of the French Third Republic during the Turkish War of Independence.  It was returned to Turkish control after the Treaty of Lausanne was signed, formally ending hostilities between Turkey and the Allies of World War I.

Originally known as Antep, the title gazi (meaning veteran in Turkish) was added to the province's and the provincial capital's name in 1921, due to its population's actions during the Turkish War of Independence.

Kilis Province was part of Gaziantep Province until it separated in 1994. Turks are the majority in the province.

Geography 
Gaziantep is traversed by the northeasterly line of equal latitude and longitude.

Geology 
Two major active geological faults meet in western Gaziantep near the border with adjoining Osmaniye Province: the Dead Sea Transform and the East Anatolian Fault.  These represent the tectonic boundary between the northward-moving Arabian Plate to the east, and the converging African and Eurasian Plates to the west.

On February 6, 2023, at 04:17 TRT (01:17 UTC), a  7.8 earthquake ocurred in Gaziantep Province on the East Anatolian Fault, which caused widespread damage and loss of life. At 13:24, it was followed by a 7.7 earthquake.

Demographics

Districts

There are nine districts as listed below:

The city of Gaziantep encompasses Şahinbey and Şehitkamil districts; Islahiye and Nurdağı districts form the western part of the province, while the remaining districts lie to the east of Gaziantep city.

See also
 List of populated places in Gaziantep Province
 Yesemek Quarry and Sculpture Workshop

References

External links 

  Gaziantep weather forecast information
  Gaziantep local newspaper
  All about cultural activities in Gaziantep